The Royal Society for the Blind (RSB), formerly the Institute for the Blind and Royal Institute for the Blind, is a not-for-profit organisation providing services to South Australians who are blind or vision impaired.

The RSB was founded by Andrew Whyte Hendry (who was blinded as a child) and Sir Charles Goode in 1884, as the Institute for the Blind when they started an industrial school. It  later became the Royal Institute for the Blind in 1903, and the Royal Society for the Blind in 1974.

References

External links

Clubs and societies in Australia
1884 establishments in Australia
Organisations based in Australia with royal patronage
Blindness organisations in Australia